Erioptera caliptera is a species of limoniid crane fly in the family Limoniidae.

Subspecies
These three subspecies belong to the species Erioptera caliptera:
 Erioptera caliptera caliptera g
 Erioptera caliptera femoranigra Alexander, 1913 c g
 Erioptera caliptera subevanescens Alexander, 1940 c g
Data sources: i = ITIS, c = Catalogue of Life, g = GBIF, b = Bugguide.net

References

Limoniidae
Articles created by Qbugbot
Insects described in 1823